Ballymoney High School is a secondary school located in Ballymoney, County Antrim, Northern Ireland. It has 650 pupils and takes in some 137  new pupils each year.

Ballymoney High's Principal is Mr Bingham.

In 2016, a new expansion of the school was built, and in 2017 it was officially named the ‘ Holmes wing’ named after Mollie Holmes OBE, a retired mayor of Ballymoney who died at age 101.

References 

Ballymoney High Schools

Secondary schools in County Antrim
High School